In architecture, an alcove is a small recessed section of a room or an arched opening (as in a wall).
The section is partially enclosed by such vertical elements as walls, pillars and balustrades.

Etymology
The word alcove originates from Arabic: القبة, al-, 'the', and qubbah, 'vault' (through the Spanish, alcoba).

See also
 Niche (architecture)
 Mihrab
 Box-bed
 Tokonoma
 Setback (architecture)

References

External links 
 

Architectural elements